Chesterton station could refer to:

 Chesterton railway station, a closed station in Chesterton, Cambridge
 Chesterton station (New York Central Railroad), a closed station in Chesterton, Indiana